The 1946 Northwestern Wildcats team was an American football team that represented Northwestern University during the 1946 Big Ten Conference football season. In their 12th and final year under head coach Pappy Waldorf, the Wildcats compiled a 4–4–1 record (2–3–1 against conference opponents), finished in seventh place in the Big Nine Conference, and outscored opponents by a total of 156 to 136. 

The team ranked first in the Big Nine, and ninth nationally, in rushing offense with an average of 217.6 rushing yards per game. 

Halfback Vic Schwall was selected by both the Associated Press and United Press as a first-team player on the 1946 All-Big Nine Conference football team. Guard Ed Hirsch was selected by the Central Press Association as a first-team player on the 1946 All-America college football team.

Schedule

After the season

The 1947 NFL Draft was held on December 16, 1946. The following Wildcats were selected.

References

Northwestern
Northwestern Wildcats football seasons
Northwestern Wildcats football